Wayne K. Garfield (January 21, 1952 - September 9, 2022) was an American composer, collaborating songwriter, vocalist, social entrepreneur, community activist, and producer, who was born in 1952 in New York City.  He co-founded of the music collective Change, which launched the career of Luther Vandross with the hit song "The Glow of Love" which became #1 on the Billboard Dance/Disco Chart in the summer of 1980.In addition, Garfield’s songs appear on Platinum-Plus recordings by Luther Vandross, J. Cole, Now! 7, and Janet Jackson (2010 Best of Number Ones; 2010 Icon: Number Ones, 2009 Number Ones, 2009 The Best). Garfield was an active participant in the National Basketball Association (NBA), and internationally as a player representative. Among his successful clients were NBA Summer League standout, Chedney Gray and Jimmy Baxter, who in 2006 was the recipient of the France (Pro, A) basketball league’s Sixth Man of the Year and Newcomer of the Year.

Career
Garfield's career started as a singer with The Voices of East Harlem a rock and soul group. The group was formed in 1969 in Harlem, New York City.  The group recorded with Elektra, Just Sunshine, and Motown. The Voices of East Harlem was a 20-member ensemble aged 12 to 21. The group worked with producers Leroy Hutson and Curtis Mayfield. 
Garfield was a member of the Change collected. He has composed music for Janet Jackson, Luther Vandross, Roy Ayers, Kurtis Blow, Taj Mahal, Dee Dee Bridgewater,  soundtrack for the movie Coffy, Salt-N-Pepa, Aretha Franklin, and Fela Kuti. He has functioned in the capacity of composer, lyricist, manager and arranger for three decades. In 1973 Garfield wrote the soundtrack and vocals for the movie Coffy. The movie was directed by Jack Hill.

He has worked with Angela Winbush and Debye Burrell to develop their careers.

Garfield has worked with Carl Clay and he is one of the co-founders of Black Spectrum Theater in South Jamaica Queens, New York City. The theatre was founded in 1970s.

In 1986 Garfield united Kurtis Blow and Bob Dylan in producing "Street Rock", which became a hip-hop crossover.

In 2002,  Garfield formed the advocacy group "Writers Rule Coalition", for songwriters to gain award recognition.

In 2003, through the direct efforts of Garfield, the National Academy of Recording Arts and Sciences Board of Trustees awarded the Winners Certificate to songwriters and producers of Grammy nominated and winning recordings containing samples. Which gave writers and producers recognition for their contribution.

Discography

Composer

 2019	Everything and More: The Complete Collection 1980–2019; (Change Collective) 	
 2018	KOD; J. Cole	
 2014	The Box Set Series; Luther Vandross	
 2013	12" Disco: The Collection		
 2011	Love & Revolution; Nicola Conte	
 2010	Best of Number Ones; Janet Jackson	
 2010	Icon: Number Ones; Janet Jackson	
 2009	Louder;	Big Ali	Recording
 2009	Number Ones; Janet Jackson	
 2009	Old School Jams, Vol. 8		
 2009	The Best; Janet Jackson	
 2008	Drew's Famous Just Dance & Party; The Hit Crew	
 2008	From A Distant Point Of View 2nd Edition; Geb.El	
 2008	Sunset Chill: Ibiza Edition		
 2006	Forever, for Always, for Luther, Vol. 2		
 2006	In the House of Love; Dimitri from Paris	
 2005	Cafe Ibiza, Vol. 6: The Ambient & Chill Out Album		
 2005	Complete 80's Soul Weekender		
 2005	Nova Latino, Vol. 2		
 2005	Rock On: Breakout Years	Luther Vandross	
 2004	Artist Collection: Luther Vandross; Luther Vandross	
 2004	From Janet. To Damita Jo: The Videos [Amaray]; Janet Jackson	
 2004	From Janet. To Damita Jo: The Videos [Jewelcase]; Janet Jackson	
 2004	In the House; Dimitri from Paris	
 2004	Smooth Sax Tribute to Janet Jackson		
 2004	The String Quartet Tribute to Janet Jackson; Vitamin String Quartet	
 2003	Best of Change [WEA International]; Change	
 2003	Club Hits 2000-2003		
 2003	Destination Motherland: The Roy Ayers Anthology	Roy Ayers	
 2003	Ibiza: The History of House		
 2003	Live Radio City Music Hall 2003	- Luther Vandross	
 2003	Magnum Opus, Vol. 3		
 2003	Party Tyme Karaoke: Pop Party Pack; Sybersound	
 2003	Pure Energy Party Pack		
 2003	Smooth Sax Tribute to Luther Vandross		
 2003	The Essential Luther Vandross; Luther Vandross	
 2003	The Return of Funk Phenomena		
 2002	Boom Box Flava		
 2002	Elemental Chill, Vol. 1: Fire		
 2002	Party Deluxe		
 2002	Shining Symbol: The Ultimate Collection	Roy Ayers	
 2002	Stop to Love; Luther Vandross
 2002	Superclub Presents: Lounge		
 2002	Tom Joyner Presents: The Old School Mix Returns		
 2002	Ultimate Cheeky Party Album		
 2001	All for You; Janet Jackson	
 2001	Chartbuster Karaoke: The Best of Female Pop 2001, Vol. 2		
 2001	Creating Patterns; 4hero	
 2001	DJ's Choice: Pop Princess		
 2001	Drew's Famous Hip Pop Today; Drew's Famous	
 2001	Drew's Famous Pop Hits 2002; Drew's Famous	
 2001	Festivalbar 2001: Compilation Rossa		
 2001	Limited Edition	Geb.El	
 2001	Millennium Jazz, Vol. 5		
 2001	More Cold Feet		
 2001	Now That's What I Call Music! 7		
 2001	Now! 6 [Canada]		 
 2001	Party Tyme Karaoke: Super Hits, Vol. 3	Sybersound	
 2001	Room Service, Vol. 1		
 2001	Sing a Happy Song: The Warner Bros. Recordings;	Taj Mahal (Vocals & Background)
 2001	Smash Hits Summer 2001		
 2001	The Annual: Millennium Edition		
 2001	Upside Down/Music of Many Colours; Fela Kuti	
 2000	2000 Black: The Good Good		
 2000	Club Hits 2000		
 2000	Disco's Greatest Hits		
 2000	Fresh Hits '99		
 2000	Galaxy Weekend		
 2000	Love 2 Dance [Import]		
 2000	Massive Dance Hits 2000		
 2000	Old School Funk Box Set		
 2000	Old School Funk, Vol. 3		
 2000	Party Zone, Vol. 5		
 2000	Sampled		
 2000	Suspicious Minds [Time Music]; Candi Staton	
 1999	40 Classic Dance Anthems; Dave Pearce	
 1999	Ayia Napa Discovered		
 1999	Boom, Vol. 2		
 1999	Celebration 2000 [Enigma]		
 1999	Club Mix 2000 [K-Tel]		
 1999	Cream Ibiza: Arrivals/Llegadas		
 1999	Disco Blueprints: The Original Inspirational Underground Disco Anthems		
 1999	Disco Box		
 1999	Fat Pop Hits		
 1999	Kiss Clublife		
 1999	Kolasi 2000		
 1999	Now Dance 2000		
 1999	Now Phats What I Small Music; Phats & Small	
 1999	Soul Weekender Anthems		
 1998	A Rose Is Still a Rose;	Aretha Franklin	
 1998	Collection; Roy Ayers	
 1998	Dance with Angels		
 1998	Here We Go Again; Aretha Franklin	
 1998	Pieces of a Man	AZ	
 1998	The Very Best of Change;	Change	
 1997	Best Disco Album in the Universe, Vol. 5		
 1997	Free to Be, Vol. 10		
 1997	Jewelz	O.C.	
 1997	The Best of Roy Ayers: Love Fantasy; Roy Ayers	(Vocals, & Vocals Background)
 1995	Evolution: The Polydor Anthology; Roy Ayers (Arranger, Vocals, Vocals Background), Bass, Composer, Featured Artist
 1995	Love Ballads [Connoisseur Collection]		
 1995	Naked and True;	Randy Crawford	
 1995	Representin' the Streets		
 1995	The Best of Candi Staton [Warner Bros.]; Candi Staton	
 1995	Young Hearts Run Free: The Best of Candi Staton; Candi Staton	
 1994	The Best of Kurtis Blow; Kurtis Blow;	Vocals (Background)
 1994	The Sun Rises in the East; Jeru the Damaja	
 1993	Searching to Find the One; Unlimited Touch (Hand clapping)
 1992	The Disco Years, Vol. 3: Boogie Fever		
 1989	The Best of Luther Vandross: The Best of Love; Luther Vandross	
 1986	Kingdom Blow; Kurtis Blow;	Vocals (Background)
 1981	You'll Never Know; Hi Gloss	Producer, Assistant Producer, Composer
 1980	Music of Many Colours;	Roy Ayers / Fela Kuti	Arranger
 1980	The Glow of Love; Change	
 1979	Chance;	Candi Staton	
 1973	Virgo Red; Roy Ayers / Roy Ayers Ubiquity

Vocals
 1986	Kingdom Blow	                Kurtis Blow	Vocals (Background)
 1980	Kurtis Blow                     Kurtis Blow	Main Personnel, Vocals (Background)
 1979	Fever                           Roy Ayers	
 1977	Evolution (The Most Recent)	Taj Mahal	
 1975	A Tear to a Smile	        Roy Ayers / Roy Ayers Ubiquity album, 	Arranger, Vocals, Composer
 1974	Change Up the Groove	        Roy Ayers / Roy Ayers Ubiquity album, 	Arranger, Vocals, Vocals (Background), Performer, Composer
 1973	Coffy                           Roy Ayers/Vocals, Featured Artist, Primary Artist/ [Coffy Original Motion Picture Soundtrack]
 1973	Red, Black & Green	        Roy Ayers / Roy Ayers Ubiquity	Vocals (Background)

Record Labels
 Polydor Records
 Universal Records
 Universal Music Group International
 Elektra
 Just Sunshine

Awards
 • 2002 American Society of Composers, Authors and Publishers (ASCAP) Award for Most Airplay on Pop and R&B Radio “All for You” by Janet Jackson
 2002 Grammy Award for Best Dance Recording “All for You” by Janet Jackson
 1980 Billboard Disco Chart Longevity

References

See also
 Wayne Garfield 'Coffy Soundtrack'

20th-century American singers
21st-century American singers
African-American male composers
African-American composers
20th-century African-American male singers
American male composers
20th-century American composers
American robbers
American rhythm and blues singer-songwriters
American soul singers
Polydor Records artists
20th-century American male singers
21st-century American male singers
African-American songwriters
21st-century African-American male singers
American male singer-songwriters